Eric Boakye (born 19 November 1999) is a Ghanaian footballer who plays as a defender for Aris Limassol.

Honours
Olimpija Ljubljana
Slovenian Cup: 2018–19, 2020–21

References

1999 births
Living people
Footballers from Kumasi
Ghanaian footballers
Association football defenders
NK Olimpija Ljubljana (2005) players
Aris Limassol FC players
Slovenian PrvaLiga players
Cypriot First Division players
Ghanaian expatriate footballers
Expatriate footballers in Slovenia
Ghanaian expatriate sportspeople in Slovenia
Expatriate footballers in Cyprus
Ghanaian expatriate sportspeople in Cyprus